Four skating is a figure skating and artistic roller skating discipline. Fours teams consist of two women and two men. The sport is similar to pair skating, with elements including overhead lifts, twist lifts, death spirals, and throw jumps, as well as the elements of single skating in unison, pairs elements in unison and unique elements that involve all four skaters. Fours is not an Olympic event and is rarely competed. It was discontinued from the Canadian Figure Skating Championships following the 1996-1997 season.

Figure skating disciplines